Peter or Pete Young may refer to:

Sports
 Peter Dalton Young (1927–2002), English rugby union player
 Peter Young (cricketer, born 1961), Australian cricketer
 Pete Young (born 1968), American baseball player
 Peter Young (rugby league) (fl. 1970s), Australian rugby league player
 Peter Young (skier) (fl. 1984–1994), British paralympic skier
 Peter Young (cricketer, born 1986), English cricketer

Others
 Peter Young (tutor) (1544–1628), Scottish diplomat, tutor to James VI of Scotland
 Peter Young (British Army officer) (1912–1976), British general
 Peter Young (historian) (1915–1988), British World War II soldier
 Peter Young (priest) (1916–1987), British Anglican clergyman, Archdeacon of Cornwall
 Peter Young (artist) (born 1940), American artist
 Peter Young (judge) (born 1940), Australian judge
 Peter C. Young (born 1940), British-born ichthyologist and parasitologist
 Peter J. Young (1954-1981), British cosmologist
 Peter Young (set decorator) (fl. 1968–present), Academy Award-winning set director
 Peter Young (banker) (fl. 1980s–present), American banker
 Peter Young (activist) (fl. 1990s–present), American animal rights activist
 Peter J. Young, British astrophysicist

Other uses
 Peter Young Stakes, Australian horse race

See also
 Peter the Younger (1547–1568), Prince of Wallachia